Tall Changi-ye Sofla (also Romanized as Tall Changī-ye Soflá; also known as Tal Jangalī, Tall Changī, and Tall Jangī) is a village in Vardasht Rural District, in the Central District of Semirom County, Isfahan Province, Iran. At the 2006 census, its population was 35, in 10 families.

References 

Populated places in Semirom County